The Stawell Gift is Australia's oldest and richest short-distance running race.

The final of the iconic main race is run on grass over  up a slight gradient. Competitors are handicapped according to their form, with each competitor "marked" by between 0 m and 10 m or more to theoretically reach the finish line at the same time. This process is administered by the Victorian Athletic League (VAL). Due to the relatively short handicap limit, the class of runners that can potentially win the event is limited compared to other Gifts in Australia.

The winner is, hypothetically, the runner who can best "rise to the occasion" and perform better than their previous form, although the key can often be to perform slightly below their best in lead-up events and thus receive a favourable handicap. In 2020 due to the COVID-19 pandemic in Australia the race was postponed, but in May the race was cancelled, the first time since World War 2. In 2021, branded as the "Powercor Stawell Gift", the race was run at its usual Easter long weekend dates on 3–5 April.

History
The Stawell Gift began in 1878 at the end of the gold rush, as the "Easter Gift" of £24 (several thousands in today's dollars) conducted by the Stawell Athletic Club in a program of seven races, most run in multiple heats. It has been raced every year since, except for four years during the Second World War, and in 2020 due to the world-wide COVID-19 pandemic. Originally it was the townspeople putting together an entertainment package to happen over Easter, complete with 'special trains' to the event.  Today it is the most prestigious footrace in Australia, with a $40,000AUD first prize.  The finals are televised live around Australia, and internationally.

Electronic timing was introduced in 1982 thus allowing higher precision in race results.

In July 2009 the city of Ballarat made a bid to "poach" the Gift. They offered the Stawell Athletic Club A$1.25 million to host the race from 2010, for five years. At this time the Gift had financial difficulties. The offer was withdrawn later in July. The Victorian state government "ruled out" providing monetary assistance.

In 2010 the Gift track was found to be around 3 metres too long, with times much slower than expected during the heats.

In 2019 the Gift was having trouble attracting sponsors. This resulted in a reduction in prizemoney. In 2018 the prize pool for the men's and women's Gift was A$40,000 each race, which was reduced by A$15,000 in 2019. The Northern Grampians Shire Council offered assistance. It has been estimated that the Gift contributes A$5 million to the local economy.
 
In 2020 due to the COVID-19 pandemic the race was initially postponed. The Stawell Athletic Club was considering "… options to run the event later in the year". In May the 2020 race was cancelled, the first time since World War 2.

Powercor Australia are the naming rights sponsor for five years, starting in 2021.

The 2021 Gift, branded as the "Powercor Stawell Gift" and the 139th event, ran on its usual Easter long weekend dates of 3–5 April. It was won by Edward Ware of Victoria, and the women's event was won by Hayley Orman from South Australia.

Format
On Easter Saturday the heats are conducted, with the winner of each heat going through to the semi-finals along with the next best fastest times. On Easter Monday, the six semi-finals are run approximately two hours before the final, with only semi-final winners advancing to the final. Six semi-finals were first run in 1988, before which there were only five semi-finals.

The Gift is run on a 120 m grass track in front of the 100-year-old Stawell Grandstand, and the athletes run in lanes that are separated by lane ropes rather than painted lines.

The idea of the handicap system is that all runners should, theoretically, cross the line at the same time. The handicapper works out what mark or handicap the runner will have according to their previous performances in sprint events. Currently the maximum handicap is 10 metres, although this is occasionally increased to 11.

Each metre in handicap denotes approximately a tenth of a second in time. Race winners are often those that are able to "beat the handicapper", in that they need to perform well enough to qualify for the event and the finals, but below what they are truly capable of, so that they receive a handicap that gives them the best chance of a victory. The handicapping system often ends up pitting local runners against international professionals.

Gambling is allowed in the venue, and there is an extensive bookmaker's compound.

While the Stawell Gift is the feature race, the meeting also includes many other races, with more than sixty events taking place over the three-day meeting. The Women's Gift has run since 1989. In 2015, the Women's Gift had equal prizemoney with the men's for the first time.

Records

Winners 
Winners of the Stawell Gift have been:

Notes:
# Converted to metric distances in 1973.
* Commenced electronic timing in 1982.

1878: First winner 
The inaugural winner was William J. "Bill" Millard (1855–1939), a farmer from Condah, Victoria, who reputedly trained by chasing kangaroos. Millard, running off 3 yards, won the race when the leading runner, W.J. Lambell, of Birregurra, running off 11 yards, fell two yards before the finish of the race. In 1889, aged 34, he won the 220 yards handicap at Stawell, running off 18 yards; and, at the same meeting, having been run out in the Gift's heats, he came third (off 11 yards) in the consolation race, the 120-yard Jubilee Handicap. Millard married twice, had 22 children, and died in 1939. His great-grandson, Daniel Millard, won the Stawell Gift in 1997.

Winners from scratch 
Only two people have ever won the men's race running from scratch (0 m handicap):
Multiple time Malagasy Olympian Jean-Louis Ravelomanantsoa in 1975. Due to winning from scratch, Ravelomanantsoa also technically holds the fastest ever time of 12.0 seconds.
Athens 2004 and London 2012 Olympian and multiple Australian 100m and 200m champion Joshua Ross in 2005.

Multiple winners 
Three sprinters have won the race more than once: 
Bill Howard (1966, 1967) (the only back-to-back winner);
Barry Foley (1970, 1972);
Joshua Ross (2003, 2005).

Stawell Gift Olympians 
Four Australian Olympians have won the Stawell Gift: 
Dean Capobianco (1990) – 1992 Olympics, Barcelona & 1996 Olympics, Atlanta
Steve Brimacombe (1991) – 1996 Olympics, Atlanta
Andrew McManus (1992) – 2004 Olympics, Athens (Squad only, did not compete)
Joshua Ross (2003, 2005) – 2004 Olympics, Athens and 2012 Summer Olympics, London

VFL winners 
The following Gift winners also played senior VFL football:
 1897: George Stuckey, Essendon; won in 12.2 seconds, running off a handicap of 12 yards, and was also captain of Essendon's 1897 premiership team.
 1899: Norman Clark, Carlton; won in 11.8 seconds, running off a handicap of 14½ yards.
 1900: Dave Strickland, St Kilda, father of Shirley Strickland; won in 12 seconds, running off a handicap of 10 yards.
 1902: Alf Tredinnick, Melbourne; won in 12.2 seconds, running off 11½ yards. 
 1914: Billy Robinson, Carlton; won in 11.8 seconds, running off 12 yards.
 1924: Bill Twomey, Sr., Collingwood and Hawthorn, father of Bill Twomey Jr, Pat Twomey, and Mick Twomey, and grandfather of David Twomey; won in 12.1 seconds, running off a handicap of 8½ yards.
 1929: Clarrie Hearn, Essendon; won in 11 and fifteen sixteenths of a second, running off a handicap of 10 yards.
 1936: Ron McCann, Collingwood; won in 12 and 4 sixteenths of a second, running off a handicap of 6½ yards.
 1938: Jack Grant, Geelong and Fitzroy; won in 11 and eleven-sixteenths seconds, running off a handicap of 11½ yards.
 1952: Lance Mann, Essendon; won in 11 and fourteen-sixteenths seconds, running off a handicap of 7¼ yards.
 1956: Bill Williams, Richmond; won in 11.8 seconds, running off a handicap of 12 yards.
 1971: Treva McGregor, Fitzroy; won in 11.7 seconds, running off a handicap of 7¼ yards.

Relocation

On a number of occasions there has been discussions about relocating the Stawell Gift for economic reasons.

On 14 February 2001, after much discussion about moving the event to Docklands Stadium in Melbourne, Premier Steve Bracks announced on ABC Local Radio that the Gift would be staying in Stawell and the State Government's $40,000 contribution would continue.

On 14 July 2009, it was announced that Ballarat had offered the Stawell Athletic Club more than $1 million in cash and incentives, including a $20,000 grant to the Stawell Gift Hall of Fame, to relocate the Gift from Central Park in Stawell to Ballarat City Oval for five years. The Club released a statement through Secretary Ian Lawrie stating they were considering the offer but the "decision is, without question, the most difficult ever undertaken by the Committee of the Stawell Athletic Club". He said the club would investigate and exhaust all other options to ensure the survival of Australia's most famous footrace.

On 16 September 2009 Victorian Premier John Brumby announced more than $300,000 State Government funding to keep the Stawell Gift in Stawell.

Womens Gift
 Race was 100m from 1989 to 2005, and over the traditional gift distance of 120m since 2006.

Further reading

Footnotes

References
 Watt, Gary. Stawell Gift Almanac. Legacy Books (2008). Includes the details of every heat, semi-final and final ever run. Available from the Stawell Athletic Club.
 Pandora Internet Archive of the Stawell Gift
 The Sports Factor Transcript Sport and Religion over Easter, 10 April 1998
 
 ABC Asia-Pacific Nexus 6 September 2005 Transcript
 Esthonian Enters for Stawell Gift., The Argus (Australia), Saturday 24 February 1934, Page 18
 Wells (Samuel Garnet Wells (1885-1972)), "Stawell Stalwarts", The Age, (Monday, 14 April 1952), p.12.

External links

 Official Website of the Stawell Gift
 Tourism Victoria Site
 Joshua Ross winning the Gift in 2005 from The Age website.

Athletics competitions in Australia
Sprint (running)
1878 establishments in Australia
Sports competitions in Victoria (Australia)
Wimmera
Recurring sporting events established in 1878
Stawell, Victoria
Running in Australia